The 1943–44 Washington Huskies men's basketball team represented the University of Washington for the  NCAA college basketball season. Led by 24th-year head coach Hec Edmundson, the Huskies were members of the Pacific Coast Conference and played their home games on campus at the UW Pavilion in Seattle, Washington.

Washington's only conference loss was at Idaho in the penultimate 
There was no conference playoff series this year and the Huskies did not play in the eight-team NCAA tournament.

References

External links
Sports Reference – Washington Huskies: 1943–44 basketball season

Washington Huskies men's basketball seasons
Washington Huskies
Washington
Washington